USS Pequeni was a United States Navy patrol vessel in commission from 1917 or 1918 to the end of 1918.

Pequeni was built as a motor launch of the same name at Balboa in the Panama Canal Zone for the Panama Canal Company. Sometime in 1917 or 1918, the U.S. Navy acquired her for use as a section patrol boat during World War I. She never received a section patrol (SP) number, but she was commissioned as USS Pequeni.

Service history
Pequeni conducted patrols in the Panama Canal Zone for the rest of World War I. She was stricken from the Navy List on 31 December 1918 and was returned to the Panama Canal Company the same day.

References
 
 Pequeni at Department of the Navy Naval History and Heritage Command Online Library of Selected Images: U.S. Navy Ships -- Listed by Hull Number "SP" #s and "ID" #s -- World War I Era Vessels without Numbers (listed alphabetically by name)
 NavSource Online: Section Patrol Craft Photo Archive Pequeni

Patrol vessels of the United States Navy
World War I patrol vessels of the United States
Ships built in the Panama Canal Zone
1917 ships